Lucilius A. Emery (July 27, 1840 – August 26, 1920), of Portland, Maine, was a justice of the Maine Supreme Judicial Court from October 5, 1883, to July 27, 1911.

Born in Carmel, Maine, Emery graduated from Bowdoin College in 1861 and read law to gain admission to the bar in 1863, at which time he settled in Ellsworth, Maine. He was the elected to the Maine Senate in 1874 and 1875, and then as Maine Attorney General from 1876 to 1879. On October 5, 1883, Governor Frederick Robie appointed Emery as an associate justice. He became chief justice on December 14, 1906, and serving in that capacity until his resignation on July 27, 1911.

He died in Ellsworth.

Family
Emery's son was economist Henry Crosby Emery.

References

Justices of the Maine Supreme Judicial Court
Maine Attorneys General
Bowdoin College alumni
U.S. state supreme court judges admitted to the practice of law by reading law
1840 births
1920 deaths
Maine state senators
People from Penobscot County, Maine
Politicians from Portland, Maine